Varnupiai is a small village in Marijampolė municipality, Lithuania, 4 miles southwest of Daukšiai. In the south of the village is Žuvinto Palios, the swamp of Žuvintas Lake.

On the area of the village stands Varnupiai Mound, one of the most impressive remains of the Yotvingians culture, researched by archaeologists in 1971.

People 
 Christopher Szwernicki, Polish Roman Catholic priest

References 

Villages in Marijampolė County